In Greek mythology, Perimele or Perimela is the name of three mythical personages:

Perimele, daughter of Amythaon. She and Antion, son of Periphas, were the possible parents of Ixion.
Perimele, daughter of Admetus and Alcestis, mother of Magnes by Argus (son of Phrixus and Chalciope).
Perimele, daughter of Hippodamas, who was loved by Achelous and lay with him secretly. When her father discovered that, he pushed her off a cliff into the sea. Achelous kept her floating on the waves for a while, imploring Poseidon to help her. The sea god transformed her into an island which bore her name, one of the Echinades.

Notes

References 

 Antoninus Liberalis, The Metamorphoses of Antoninus Liberalis translated by Francis Celoria (Routledge 1992). Online version at the Topos Text Project.
 Diodorus Siculus, The Library of History translated by Charles Henry Oldfather. Twelve volumes. Loeb Classical Library. Cambridge, Massachusetts: Harvard University Press; London: William Heinemann, Ltd. 1989. Vol. 3. Books 4.59–8. Online version at Bill Thayer's Web Site
 Diodorus Siculus, Bibliotheca Historica. Vol 1-2. Immanel Bekker. Ludwig Dindorf. Friedrich Vogel. in aedibus B. G. Teubneri. Leipzig. 1888-1890. Greek text available at the Perseus Digital Library.
 Publius Ovidius Naso, Metamorphoses translated by Brookes More (1859-1942). Boston, Cornhill Publishing Co. 1922. Online version at the Perseus Digital Library.
 Publius Ovidius Naso, Metamorphoses. Hugo Magnus. Gotha (Germany). Friedr. Andr. Perthes. 1892. Latin text available at the Perseus Digital Library.

Women in Greek mythology
Aetolian characters in Greek mythology
Messenian characters in Greek mythology
Thessalian characters in Greek mythology
Thessalian mythology
Metamorphoses into terrain in Greek mythology